Cane Creek Canyon Nature Preserve is a  private nature preserve in Colbert County, Alabama, south of Tuscumbia that opened in 1986 and is owned by Jim and Faye Lacefield. The land's features include waterfalls, wetlands, streams, glades, cliffs, and the canyon. The preserve, which is open to the public, has  of hiking trails, and access to the preserve is free.

References

External links 

 Friends of Cane Creek Canyon Nature Preserve

Parks in Alabama
Canyons and gorges of Alabama